Versatile is the sixth studio album by American rock band Pop Evil.  Released on May 21, 2021, the work was published via Entertainment One.

Critical reception
Blabbermouth stated that "Pop Evil's songwriting on Versatile zeros in on their juxtaposition of cinematic melody and heavy, unflinching groove. Deftly mixing fist-pumping anthems and timeless power ballads, Pop Evil delivers their most ambitious rebirth yet with a jaw-dropping and unpredictable album. Versatile sounds exactly like the name suggests. It distills the soaring melodies and driving riffs of Pop Evil's past and introduces an ambitious exploration of the future". Nic Kubes of Modern Drummer stated that "Versatile gives both new and long-time Pop Evil fans something to celebrate, staying true to the band's recognizable sound, while also presenting something new at each turn. This record delivers a powerful and captivating performance, earning its place amongst the best in Pop Evil's body of work."

Track listing

Charts

Singles

References

2021 albums
Pop Evil albums
E1 Music albums